was a town located in Hienuki District, Iwate Prefecture, Japan.

History
The village was raised to town status on April 1, 1928 and renamed Ishidoriya at that time.

On January 1, 2006, Ishidoriya, along with the town of Ōhasama (from Hienuki District), and the town of Tōwa (from Waga District), was merged into the expanded city of Hanamaki, and no longer exists as an independent municipality.

As of January 1, 2006, the town had an estimated population of 15,951 and a population density of 134.5 persons per km2. The total area was 118.57 km2.

Ishidoriya had a sister city relationship with Rutland, Vermont.

External links
 Hanamaki official website 

Dissolved municipalities of Iwate Prefecture
Hanamaki, Iwate